Bickleigh Barracks is a military installation at Bickleigh, South Hams which is currently used by 42 Commando.

History
The barracks were built by A French & Co and completed in early 1940 during the Second World War. In 1950 the Commando School Royal Marines which had been formed at Achnacarry during the war and which had moved to Gibraltar Barracks at Towyn after the war, relocated to the barracks. The Commando School moved to Lympstone in February 1960. The barracks became the home of 42 Commando in 1971.

References

Royal Marines bases
Bickleigh, South Hams